Pamela Betty McGeorge BEM was a Women's Royal Naval Service motorcycle dispatch rider during World War II.

Early life 
Pamela Betty McGeorge was born on 29 October 1918, in Edgebaston, to Mabel Maud (née Cooper) and John McGeorge. She was baptised at St Bartholomew's Church, Edgbaston on 30 November 1918. Her father was a surveyor of taxes.

Second World War 
McGeorge initially joined the Women's Land Army aged 20, in 1939, having been at physical training college. She resigned to join the Women's Royal Naval Service.

On 30 September 1941, when a WREN third officer, she received the British Empire Medal, for bravery in carrying urgent despatches on foot in an air raid. She delivered a despatch to a command post at the naval shipyards in Devonport, Plymouth on 22 April 1940, after being thrown from her motorcycle by a German bomb during the air raid, then volunteering for more despatch duty. McGeorge had been a Sea Ranger. She underwent training WREN's officer training at Greenwich and was promoted to acting second officer on 29 January 1944 and was listed as a second officer in the Womens Royal Navy (Supplementary) Reserve in 1960.

A portrait of McGeorge by British painter Anthony Devas is in the collection of The Hepworth Wakefield.

Later life 
McGeorge settled in the family home in Cheltenham after the war.

References

Sources 

 
 
 
 
 

1918 births
British women in World War II
Recipients of the British Empire Medal
Women's Royal Naval Service officers
Year of death missing
British motorcycle pioneers
Women's Land Army members (World War II)
People from Edgbaston
People from Cheltenham